Tree Canada is a non-profit charitable organization that promotes the planting and nurturing of trees in Canada's urban and rural areas. It provides tree-related education, technical assistance and resources to communities, corporations, individuals and non-profit organizations.

History 

Tree Canada began in 1992 under the name "The National Community Tree Foundation" and was originally funded by the Canadian Forest Service (CFS), a branch of the government ministry Natural Resources Canada. In collaboration with CFS, the foundation was tasked with delivering the Canadian governmental program Tree Plan Canada, which provided assistance for tree-planting projects across Canada and also sought to educate the public about the importance of trees in fighting climate change. In 1993, the first Canadian Urban Forest Conference was held. Tree Canada has been a principal organizer since the inception of the conference. 

In 2007, the Government of Canada ceased funding the organization, prompting it to rebrand as "Tree Canada" as it transitioned to a privately funded charity.

Programs 

Greening Canada’s School Grounds provides grants and resources to schools to enable them to plant and care for trees on their grounds.
TD Green Streets provides assistance to municipalities, aboriginal communities, and selected business improvement associations in the areas of tree planting, tree-related urban design, and outreach.
Grow Clean Air allows companies, households, municipalities and events to calculate their carbon dioxide emissions and take steps to offset those emissions.
Operation ReLeaf provides assistance in replanting trees in areas affected by natural pests or disasters.  The current ReLeaf program is directed at replanting trees in Alberta that were lost to the mountain pine beetle.
Edible Trees provides funding and resources to community groups and organizations to allow them to grow fruit and nut trees.
National Tree Day, inaugurated by the Canadian parliament in 2011, is a national day devoted to tree-related education and activities.
Partners in Planting and the National Greening Program both provide opportunities for community and corporate groups to plant and care for trees in their neighbourhoods.

Criticism 
Tree Canada has been accused of greenwashing large oil companies such as Shell Canada.

References 

Non-profit organizations based in Ottawa
Educational institutions established in 1992
Environmental organizations based in Ontario
Forestry in Canada
1992 establishments in Canada